The Djangadi people, also spelt Dhungatti, Dainggati, Tunggutti or Dunghutti are an Aboriginal Australian people resident in the Macleay Valley of northern New South Wales.

Language

Dhanggati / Dunghutti belongs to the Yuin–Kuric language family and is usually grouped with the Anēwan language. The Ngabu Bingayi Aboriginal Corporation promotes the revival study of their language learning as an ongoing activity in the Macleay Valley. Linguist Amanda Lissarrague has been active in assisting their efforts. The language is currently being taught at Kempsey TAFE. Part of the language was recorded and analysed by Nils Holmer and his wife.

Country
They took in the area from Point Lookout southwards as far as the headwaters of the Macleay River and the vicinity of the Mount Royal Range. To the east, their territory ran as far as the crests of the coastal ranges, while their inland extension to the west ran up to the Great Dividing Range and Walcha. The people to their north were the Gumbaynggirr. On their western flank were the Anēwan. The southern linguistic border is with Biripi.

People
They are people of the nation.
 Nulla Nulla
 Conderang.

Totems, according to some elderly informants, could be social or personal. The praying mantis (gurginj gurginj) is listed among the former as a river totem and described as covering the river stretch from Bellbrook downwards as far as the area around Georges Creek. Animals such as the echidna were personal totems, with which particular persons were identified. The term for the localized patrilineal horde was dawun.

Sacred sites

The Djangadi creation myth contains a legend about the Rainbow Serpent, who was believed to have created the gorge at Apsley Falls in the Dreamtime. Once underground, it was said to have re-emerged at the mill hole near Walcha on the Apsley River.

Burrel Bulai
Burrel Bulai (Mount Anderson) is considered to be one of the most powerful sacred sites in Thunghutti/Dunghutti Country and was registered was recorded as a place of significance by Ray Kelly, an Aboriginal Research Officer with the NSW Sites of Significance Survey team.

Long Gully
Two high ridges overlook the site, which was used, as late as 1932, for the final stages of initiation.

Carrai waterholes
Young Djangadi men went through initiation rites at Carrai Waterholes.

History
An Aboriginal presence in the Djangadi lands has been attested archaeologically to go back at least 4,000 years, according to the analysis of the materials excavated at the Clybucca midden, a site which the modern-day descendants of the Djangadi and Gumbaynggirr claim territory. Middens are attested in the Macleay Valley, together with remnants of a fish trap in the Limeburners Creek Nature Reserve and, just slightly north of Crescent Head, at Richardsons Crossing, there is a bora ring.

White intrusion on the Djangadi lands first took off as mostly ex-convict cedar cutters, based at a camp at Euroka Creek established by Captain A. C. Innes in 1827, began exploring the rich resources of the area in the late 1820s. Within a decade the timber cutters had virtually harvested every stand of this highly prized red gold timber in clearances that made the land increasingly attractive to pastoralists, who by 1847, after the Crown Lands Occupation Act of 1836 permitted squatting, had established 31 stations along the Macleay river from Kempsey inland to Kunderang Brook. This coincided with one of the most violent and sustained examples of warfare in the Macleay gorges, during which it is estimated that around 15 massacres took place in the region targeting Aboriginal people of the area.

The Djangadi and other tribes affected adopted guerilla tactics to fight the usurpation of their land, by attacking shepherds, hit-and-run raids on homesteads and duffing sheep and cattle livestock before retreating into the gorges where pursuit was difficult. Some 2 to 3 dozen people were killed for rustling sheep at a massacre which took place at Kunderang Brook in 1840. The war ended with the establishment of a force of native police at Nulla Nulla in 1851. However, by that time, attrition had devastated tribal numbers. Of the 4,000 Aboriginal people in the area before the settlements, one third are thought to have been killed in a little over two decades.

A description of the Djangadi and other Aboriginal groups in the Macleay area was given by Captain John Macdonald Henderson in 1851.

Some Djangadi settled the Shark, Pelican Island and the two Fattorini Islands in the Macleay River, gazette as Aboriginal reserves in 1885, and grew corn there. In 1924 the Fattorini island residents were relocated to Pelican Island, and its status as a reservation was cancelled. Eventually the Djangadi moved to Kinchela Creek Station though an unofficial camp remained at Green Hills, resisting attempts to have them relocated, until they were placed under the administration of a white manager at Burnt Bridge Reserve.  Discrimination barriers were finally broken in part when the first Aboriginal children were permitted in 1947 to attend
Green Hill Public School, though the white community reacted by shifting their children to West Kempsey.

Native title

The first successful mainland claim for native title was made by the Djangadi, whose rights were recognised by the New South Wales Government in the Crescent Head Agreement. They were awarded in the same year  in compensation, with an attached agreement to be paid another sum a decade later.

Djangadi culture
The Wigay Aboriginal Cultural Park near Kempsey contains over 150 different native Indigenous plants to the Macleay Valley. The site is diversified by plantations of species according to rainforest, dry forest, tropical forest, heathland and wetland niches.

Alternative names and spellings
Source:  unless otherwise indicated.

 Amberu
 Boorkutti
 Burgadi
 Burugardi (inland horde)
 Dang-getti
 Dangadi
 Dangati
 Danggadi
 Danghetti
 Dhangatty
 Dhungatti
 Djaingadi
 Himberrong
 Jang (coastal exonym for the tableland Djangadi, 'bad folk')
 Nulla Nulla
 Tang-gette
 Tangetti
 Thangatti
 Thangatty
 Yung
 Yunggai
 Yuungai

Notable Djangadi people

Boxers
 Bradley Hore 
 Renold Quinlan - Middleweight champion
 Dave Sands 
 Hector Thompson

Rugby league players
 Beau Champion
 Greg Inglis 
 Albert Kelly 
 Amos Roberts 
 Tyrone Roberts-Davis
 Jonathan Wright

Other notable Djangadi people
 Torita Blake, Paralympian athlete
 Blak Douglas, winner of the 2022 Archibald Prize
 Samantha Harris, fashion model
 Loretta Kelly, law academic 
 Amos Morris, guitarist

Notes

Citations

Sources

Aboriginal peoples of New South Wales